In mathematical logic, cointerpretability is a binary relation on formal theories: a formal theory T is cointerpretable in another such theory S, when the language of S can be translated into the language of T in such a way that S proves every formula whose translation is a theorem of T. The "translation" here is required to preserve the logical structure of formulas. 

See also
 Cotolerance
 Interpretability logic.
 Tolerance (in logic)

References
.
.

Mathematical relations
Mathematical logic